Cystiscus beqae is a species of very small sea snail, a marine gastropod mollusk or micromollusk in the family Cystiscidae.

Description
The size of the shell attains 1.46 mm.

Distribution
This marine species was found off Beqa Island, Fiji.

References

External links
 Wakefield A. & McCleery T. 2006. Descriptions of new species of Pacific Cystiscus Stimpson, 1865 (Gastropoda : Cystiscidae). Part 1: species with banded mantle patterns. Novapex 7 (Hors-série 4): 1-31

Cystiscidae
Gastropods described in 2006
Beqae